The 2013–14 ACB season is the 31st season of the Spanish basketball league Liga ACB, also called Liga Endesa in its sponsored identity. The regular season began on October 12, 2013, and ended on May 25, 2014. The playoffs began on May 29, 2014 and ended on June 26, 2014. 

FC Barcelona won their 18th league title.

Teams, venues and locations
Relegated to LEB Oro
Lagun Aro GBC (17th)
La Bruixa d'Or (18th)
Promoted from LEB Oro
Ford Burgos (Champion)
Lucentum Alicante (2nd)

Lagun Aro GBC and La Bruixa d'Or remained in Liga ACB after Ford Burgos and Lucentum Alicante failed to meet requirements for joining the league.

Managerial changes

Before the start of the season

During the season

Regular season

League table

|}

Results

Playoffs

Final standings

Notes:
 Real Madrid, FC Barcelona, Baskonia and Unicaja are qualified to Euroleague thanks to their A licence. The worst qualified team of these four can have suspended its A license if other different team qualifies to the ACB Finals.
 There is an established limit of seven ACB teams between Euroleague and Eurocup Basketball, without counting possible wildcards.
 The invitational wildcard to the EuroChallenge is not confirmed.

Stats Leaders

Performance Index Rating

Points

Rebounds

Assists

Attendances
Attendances include playoff games:

|-
|align="center"|1 ||align="left"|Real Madrid
| 203,319 || 13,217 || 5,814 || 9,242 || %
|-
|align="center"|2 ||align="left"|Laboral Kutxa
| 165,412 || 14,182 || 6,824 || 9,190 || %
|-
|align="center"|3 ||align="left"|Bilbao Basket
| 154,650 || 10,000 || 7,610 || 9,097 || %
|-
|align="center"|4 ||align="left"|CAI Zaragoza
| 152,189 || 10,853 || 6,358 || 8,010 || %
|-
|align="center"|5 ||align="left"|Valencia BC
| 168,050 || 8,500 || 6,500 || 8,002 || %
|-
|align="center"|6 ||align="left"|Tuenti Móvil Estudiantes
| 134,752 || 13,800 || 2,600 || 7,927 || %1
|-
|align="center"|7 ||align="left"|Unicaja
| 126,333 || 10,600 || 3,394 || 6,317 || %
|-
|align="center"|8 ||align="left"|Lagun Aro GBC
| 101,960 || 8,890 || 3,780 || 5,998 || %
|-
|align="center"|9 ||align="left"|UCAM Murcia
| 94,928 || 7,269 || 4,718 || 5,584 || %
|-
|align="center"|10||align="left"|FIATC Joventut
| 92,638 || 10,500 || 3,156 || 5,449 || %
|-
|align="center"|11||align="left"|Herbalife Gran Canaria
| 92,644 || 9,332 || 4,106 || 5,147 || %2
|-
|align="center"|12||align="left"|Blu:sens Monbús
| 85,841 || 6,000 || 4,438 || 5,049 || %
|-
|align="center"|13||align="left"|FC Barcelona
| 100,455 || 7,539 || 3,471 || 4,909 || %
|-
|align="center"|14||align="left"|Baloncesto Fuenlabrada
| 82,621 || 5,546 || 4,024 || 4,860 || %
|-
|align="center"|15||align="left"|Cajasol
| 74,830 || 7,260 || 2,400 || 4,157 || %
|-
|align="center"|16||align="left"|La Bruixa d'Or
| 64,361 || 4,900 || 2,100 || 4,023 || %
|-
|align="center"|17||align="left"|Iberostar Tenerife
| 65,761 || 5,100 || 2,891 || 3,868 || %
|-
|align="center"|18||align="left"|CB Valladolid
| 59,750 || 5,900 || 1,500 || 3,515 || %
|-

Highest attendance:
14,623 at Fernando Buesa Arena (Round 19, Laboral Kutxa 74–90 Real Madrid)
Lowest attendance:
1,500 at Pabellón Polideportivo Pisuerga (Round 32, CB Valladolid 68–96 CAI Zaragoza)

Awards

Regular season MVP
 Justin Doellman – Valencia BC

All-ACB Team

Best Young Player Award
 Guillem Vives – FIATC Joventut

Best All-Young Team

Player of the week

Player of the month 
{| class="wikitable sortable" style="text-align: center;"
! Month
! Week
! Player
! Team
! PIR
! Source
|-
|October||1–3||align="left"| Blagota Sekulić||align="left"|Iberostar Tenerife||27.7|| 
|-
|November||4–8||align="left"| Justin Doellman||align="left"|Valencia Basket||27.4|| 
|-
|December||9–13||align="left"| Blagota Sekulić||align="left"|Iberostar Tenerife||21.0|| 
|-
|January||14–17||align="left"| Andy Panko||align="left"|Baloncesto Fuenlabrada||21.0|| 
|-
|February||18–20||align="left"| Andy Panko||align="left"|Baloncesto Fuenlabrada||27.3|| 
|-
|March||21–25||align="left"| Maciej Lampe||align="left"|FC Barcelona||24.0|| 
|-
|April||26–29||align="left"| Justin Doellman||align="left"|Valencia Basket||21.0|| 
|-
|May||30–34||align="left"| Luke Sikma||align="left"|Iberostar Tenerife||22.2|| 
|-

See also
Supercopa de España de Baloncesto 2013
Copa del Rey de Baloncesto 2013–14
2013–14 LEB Oro season

References

External links
 ACB.com 
 linguasport.com 

 
Liga ACB seasons

 
Spain